The 2012 Audi Melbourne Pro Tennis Classic was a professional tennis tournament played on clay courts. It was the seventh edition of the tournament which was part of the 2012 ITF Women's Circuit. It took place in Indian Harbour Beach, Florida, United States between 30 April and 6 May 2012.

WTA entrants

Seeds

 1 Rankings are as of April 23, 2012.

Other entrants
The following players received wildcards into the singles main draw:
  Jan Abaza
  Alexandra Kiick
  Maria Sanchez
  Chalena Scholl

The following players received entry from the qualifying draw:
  Krista Hardebeck
  Lena Litvak
  Valeria Solovieva
  Alyona Sotnikova

The following players received entry by a lucky loser spot:
  Shelby Rogers

The following players received entry by a Special Exempt:
  Melanie Oudin

Champions

Singles

 Grace Min def.  Maria Sanchez, 6–4, 7–6(7–4)

Doubles

 Maria Fernanda Alves /  Jessica Moore def.  Marie-Ève Pelletier /  Alyona Sotnikova, 6–7(6–8), 6–3, [10–8]

External links
ITF Search
Official Website

Audi Melbourne Pro Tennis Classic